Henry Nissen OAM (born Henry Nissenbaum; 15 January 1948, in Belsen) is an Australian amateur flyweight and professional fly/bantam/featherweight boxer of the 1960s and '70s who as an amateur represented Australia and won the gold medal at flyweight in the boxing at the 1969 Maccabiah Games, and as a professional won the Australian flyweight title, and Commonwealth flyweight title, his professional fighting weight varied from , i.e. flyweight to , i.e. featherweight. He was inducted into the Australian National Boxing Hall of Fame in 2009. He currently works as a youth social worker, and is a founder of the Emerald Hill Mission.

Genealogical information
Henry Nissen was born in the Officers' Headquarters in a Displaced persons camp, outside the former Bergen-Belsen concentration camp, and is the son of a Polish Jewish father and a Ukrainian Jewish mother, who met in the Soviet Union where they had fled to avoid the holocaust.  He is the twin brother of the Australian amateur flyweight champion boxer, Leon Nissen, of the Nissenbaum family, who migrated to Australia in 1949.

References

External links

Image - Henry Nissen
The Fighter, Arnold Zable

1948 births
Australian male boxers
Australian Jews
Australian people of Polish-Jewish descent
Australian people of Ukrainian-Jewish descent
Bantamweight boxers
Featherweight boxers
Flyweight boxers
Jewish boxers
Living people
Maccabiah Games gold medalists for Australia
People from Celle
Boxers from Melbourne
Commonwealth Boxing Council champions
Sportspeople from Lower Saxony